Lóve is a 2011 Slovak-language film directed by Jakub Kroner, starring Michal Nemtuda and Kristína Svarinská, alongside Jakub Gogál. The action-romantic drama was released on October 13, 2011, while distributed by Continental Film in Slovakia, and Falcon in the Czech Republic.

Although the plot revolves around love determination, the original title refers to "money" instead, which serve as instrumental, quoting a term commonly used in the region amongst gypsies - "lóve". In English therefore, "Falling in Money", "Love Deal" or "Dirty Love", could be used as apt equivalents for the title.

Despite the mixed reviews upon its theatrical release, the work has been ranked amongst the highest-grossing films in the Slovak-cinema era, placing at number three as of November 2014.

Cast
 Michal Nemtuda as Maťo
 Jakub Gogál as Tomáš
 Kristína Svarinská as Veronika
 Dušan Cinkota as Boris, the Garage's chief
 Martina Kmeťová (credited as Tina) as Sandra
 Samuel Spišák as Pedro Hrky
 Zuzana Porubjaková as Peťa
 Roman Luknár as Investigator
 Ady Hajdu as Teacher
 Ľuboš Kostelný as Rene
 Táňa Radeva as Host
 Viktor Horján as Hotel Manager

References

External links
 Official website
 
 

2011 films
2011 romantic drama films
Slovak-language films
Films directed by Jakub Kroner
Slovak drama films